Mishra (हेमन्त मिश्रा) is an Indian character actor. He is an alumnus of the National School of Drama.

Early life and career
He is from Delhi where he acted in many TV serials, movies for Doordarshan. He later he moved to Mumbai.

Filmography

Actor

Films
Ek Ruka Hua Faisla (1986) - Juror #6
Joshilaay (1989)
Bandit Queen (1994) - Policeman
Dil Se.. (1998)
Hamara Dil Aapke Paas Hai (2000)
Pratha (2002) - Choudhary
Company (2002) - Sharma
Band Baaja Baaraat (2010, Special Appearance)
Bijuka (2012) - Painku's Friend 1 (final film role)

TV serials
Dastoor (1996)
Phir Wahi Taalash  (1989-1990)

References

External links
 
 
 

Indian male film actors
Indian male television actors
1960 births
Living people
Male actors from Delhi
National School of Drama alumni